Kobylańska may refer to:
 Wólka Kobylańska, a village in Poland
 Krystyna Kobylańska, Polish musicologist

See also
 Kobylański (disambiguation)
 Olha Kobylianska (1863-1942), Ukrainian modernist writer and feminist